Heinrich Adolf Wild von Hohenborn (8 July 1860 – 25 October 1925) was an Imperial German Army officer who served as a general and Prussian Minister of War during World War I.

Life
During his term as minister of war, from 21 January 1915 to 29 October 1916, he was critical of Paul von Hindenburg and particularly his 'Arbeitspflichtprogramm' (forced labour program). Wild von Hohenborn promulgated the Judenzählung on 11 October 1916 but did not remain in office long enough to implement it as on 29 October he was dismissed from the High Command by Wilhelm II at Hindenburg's request. He continued to serve in the field as commander of the XVI Corps and retired on 3 November 1919 with the character of a General der Infanterie.

Awards
 Pour le Mérite: 2 August 1915
 Oak Leaves: 11 October 1918
 Iron Cross (1914), 1st and 2nd Classes
Order of the Red Eagle
House Order of Hohenzollern
Order of the Griffon
Order of the Crown

External links
Books on and by Adolf Wild von Hohenborn in the catalogue of the Deutschen Nationalbibliothek
 Heinrich Adolf Wild von Hohenborn, The Prussian Machine

1860 births
1925 deaths
Generals of Infantry (Prussia)
Military personnel from Kassel
People from Hesse-Nassau
Officers of the Order of Saints Maurice and Lazarus
Commanders of the Order of Franz Joseph
Recipients of the Order of St. George of the Second Degree
Commanders of the Order of the Crown (Romania)
Recipients of the Order of the Medjidie, 2nd class
Recipients of the Pour le Mérite (military class)
Knights Commander of the Order of St Gregory the Great